KTechLab is an IDE for electronic and PIC microcontroller circuit design and simulation; it is a circuit designer with auto-routing and a simulator of common electronic components and logic elements.

KTechLab is free and open-source software licensed under the terms of the GNU GPL.

History
KTechLab was first developed by David Saxton, who worked on it until 2007. The design ideas and a lot of the current code have been developed by him.  He released various versions, up to version 0.3.6.

When David Saxton stated that he would not be able to continue developing the software, KTechLab stalled for a while before others continued his work, releasing version 0.3.7, with more components and bug fixes.

In January 2019, KTechLab was ported to Qt and KDELibs4. The new priority changed to port KTechLab to Qt5 and KF5, accomplished by version 0.50.0.

See also

 Comparison of EDA software
 List of free electronics circuit simulators

References

External links
Note that, at 2021-06-22, the KDE git repository (https://invent.kde.org/sdk/ktechlab.git, 2 weeks ago, and containing GitHub's latest commit e0bb9ff) is more recent that the GitHub git repository (https://github.com/ktechlab/ktechlab.git, 6 months ago).

KTechLab on KDE Community Wiki

KTechlab users guide

KDE software
Free electronic design automation software
Electronic design automation software for Linux
Electronic circuit simulators
Engineering software that uses Qt
Free simulation software